Kostas Tsigaridas (born in Agrafa, 1939) was a Greek lawyer and politician.

Biography 
He was born in 1939 in Agrafa. He studied law in the Aristotle University of Thessaloniki. He was member of parliament of Evrytania with PASOK from 1981 to 1989, and served as deputy minister of Agriculture from February 1987 until 1989.

References 

20th-century Greek lawyers
Aristotle University of Thessaloniki alumni
People from Evrytania
1939 births
Living people
Greek MPs 1981–1985
Greek MPs 1985–1989